Yemen participated in the 2010 Asian Games in Guangzhou, China between 12–27 November 2010. The contingent was led by They finished the games with no medals.

Athletics

Track and Field 

Source

Beach Volleyball 

Source

Chess

Artistic Gymnastics

Men's artistic individual all-around 

Source

Judo 

Source

Swimming

Taekwondo 

Source

Wrestling

Wushu

References 

 
Nations at the 2010 Asian Games